The Verville Air Coach was a four-passenger, high-wing monoplane designed in 1927 by Alfred V. Verville and produced by his company, Verville Aircraft Company. It was a comfortable, good-looking cabin monoplane which sold for $10,500. The plane made its debut at the Detroit Air Show in 1929.

Sources vary, but only 10-16 were built before Verville declared bankruptcy in 1931 at the beginning of the great depression.

Details

Having been powered originally by a 110 HP, 7 cylinder Warner Scarab, it was then sporting a 5 cyl. Wright J6 of 165 HP. Ultimately, the Air Coach would be powered by the 7 cyl. J6 of 225 HP as the model 104-C, with ATC #267. At least six of this model were produced through 1931. It spanned 44' of Clark Y, had a length of 28' 9" and a useful load of 2166 lbs, grossing at 3400 lbs. Speed maxed at 130 mph, cruised at 110, and would land at 50 mph. Edo floats were also available for this ATC.

Construction of the fuse and tail was steel tube with a clever arrangement that eliminated awkward framing around the windows of the passenger compartment. The sponsons served as attach points for both the landing gear and the forward wing struts, and also were storage for tool kit, battery and other miscellany! Wings were wood with aluminum ailerons and leading edge sheeting. The cabin was mohair fabric upholstered in a style that rivaled the finest automobiles. Navigation lights, cabin and instrument lights, metal propeller, and a choice of electric inertia starter or Heywood compressed air starters was all standard equipment.

The most interesting model of the air coach, produced later, was the diesel 104-P, which was powered by 9-cylinder Packard DR-980 diesel engine. Some evidence exists that a 104-P was sold in Italy.

Variations

Model 102 (104-W, 110 hp Warner Engine)
Wing span: 40 ft
Length: 28 ft
Empty weight: 1,525 lbs
Normal gross weight (loaded): 2,400 lbs
High speed: 110 mph
Fuel capacity: 50 gals
Cruising range: 600 miles
Cost: $7,500
Model 104-C (1928)
1928 ATC (267, 2-306)
4 passenger, cabin high-wing monoplane
110 hp Warner Scarab (span: 40'0" length: 28'0" load: 875# v: 110/x/45 range: 600)
225 hp Wright J-6 (span: 44'0" length: 28'9" load: 1234# v: 130/110/50 range: 650)
Semi-cantilever wing
Cost: $12,000
2 built
Model 104-P (Packard Diesel Coach) (1930)
9-cylinder Packard DR-980 diesel engine
ATC 316
4 passenger, cabin high-wing monoplane
225 hp Packard DR-980 diesel; length: 28'8" load: 1100# v: 130/110/50 range: 640
Cost: $11,000-12,000
1 built, modified from 104-C [NC70W]

See also

Alfred V. Verville
Verville Aircraft Company

References

External links

Air Coach
1920s United States sport aircraft
Single-engined tractor aircraft
High-wing aircraft
Aircraft first flown in 1929